Slaggyford is a village in Northumberland, England about  north of Alston, Cumbria.

It is set in South Tyne valley (often called the Tyne Gap). Hadrian's Wall lies to the north of the Tyne Gap. The South Tyne Valley falls within the North Pennines Area of Outstanding Natural Beauty (AONB), the second largest of the 40 AONBs in England and Wales.

The Pennine Way runs through the village on its way northwards from Alston to Greenhead.

The Maiden Way Roman road passes through Slaggyford, with the A689 road following the line of the Roman road for a few hundred yards on the way south out of the village.

Governance 
Slaggyford is in the parliamentary constituency of Hexham. Guy Opperman of the Conservative Party is the Member of Parliament.

Up until Brexit, for the European Parliament its residents voted to elect MEP's for the North East England constituency.

For Local Government purposes it belongs to Northumberland County Council a unitary authority, with Slaggyford lying in the South Tynedale Division. Prior to the 2009 structural changes to local government in England it was part of Tynedale district. The village is within the civil parish of Knaresdale with Kirkhaugh, from the parish's formation on 1 April 1955 to 3 August 1967 it was called "Slaggyford".

Transport 

Slaggyford was served by a railway station on the Alston Line from Haltwhistle to Alston. The line opened in 1852 and closed in 1976.

Since 1983, a 2 foot (0.61 m) narrow gauge railway has been opened on part of the original track bed.

Construction of the section of track from Lintley to Slaggyford was completed in July 2017, and as of June 2018 regular passenger trains had started to run from the station.

See also 

References

External links 

South Tynedale Railway Preservation Society

Villages in Northumberland